New Hampshire is divided into 2 congressional districts, each represented by a member of the United States House of Representatives.

The districts are currently represented in the 118th United States Congress by 2 Democrats.

Current districts and representatives
List of members of the United States House delegation from New Hampshire, their terms, their district boundaries, and the district political ratings according to the CPVI. The delegation has a total of 2 members, both Democrats.

Historical and present district boundaries
Table of United States congressional district boundary maps in the State of New Hampshire, presented chronologically. All redistricting events that took place in New Hampshire between 1973 and 2013 are shown. District numbers are represented by the map fill colors.

Obsolete districts
New Hampshire's at-large congressional district, (1789–1847)
New Hampshire's 3rd congressional district, obsolete since the 1880 census
New Hampshire's 4th congressional district, obsolete since the 1850 census

See also
United States congressional delegations from New Hampshire

References